Joe Graydon (born Joseph G. Dosh, February 6, 1919 – May 19, 2001), was an American big band vocalist, television host, personal manager and concert producer. He is the father of Grammy-winning songwriter Jay Graydon.
He is father of Gary Joseph Graydon and grandfather to Adam Joseph Graydon, Katie I Graydon, Audrey Caroline Garrish, and Ashley Diane Coats

Life and career
Graydon was born in Washington, DC on February 6, 1919, the son of Walter B. Dosh, the office manager for a typewriter company. He worked his way through Catholic University by singing in nightclubs and college events.

In 1940, he joined the FBI where he tracked down military deserters during World War II. After the war ended, he returned to music, landing a four-month stint as a vocalist on the popular radio program, "Your Hit Parade."

In 1949, he recorded the best selling single, "Again" with the Gordon Jenkins band. It would prove to be his only major hit as a recording artist, but helped him obtain a contract with KCOP TV Channel 13 in Los Angeles to host his own variety show. "The Joe Graydon Show" as it was called, later moved to KABC Channel 7 in Los Angeles and in 1955, moved to Channel 8 in San Diego.

Unable to sing Rock and Roll, Graydon decided to give up performing and transitioned into personal management. For two decades, he represented such acts as Helen Forrest, Dick Haymes, the Pied Pipers, the Ink Spots and the De Castro Sisters.

As 1940s swing music started to regain popularity, Graydon produced his first concert with Haymes and Forrest in 1978. He would eventually produce about four concerts a year.

He died of cancer in his home in Glendale, California on Saturday, May 19, 2001.

References

1919 births
2001 deaths
American jazz singers
Traditional pop music singers
People from Washington, D.C.
20th-century American singers